Drinkwater Point Road is a prominent street in Yarmouth, Maine, United States. Drinkwater Point faces Cousins Island, to which it is connected by the Ellis C. Snodgrass Memorial Bridge, and overlooks inner Casco Bay. 

Drinkwater Point Road and Drinkwater Point are named for Captain Theophilus Drinkwater, son of Allen and Hannah Drinkwater. His house, built in 1791 by his grandfather, Nicholas, stood at the southern end. Theophilus was married to Louisa Drinkwater. They had three children — Cornelia Amanda, Hannah Gray and Ferdinand. Theophilus, Louisa, Cornelia and Ferdinand are buried in the nearby Ledge Cemetery. Several other members of the notable seafaring Drinkwater family, lived nearby, including Captain Joseph Drinkwater.

Captain James Munroe Bucknam's 115-acre farm extended west to where Bucknam Point Road is today. His house, today's number 215, was built in 1740 and later became the main building of the Homewood Inn development, whose property extended to the north and west. Bucknam wed Caroline Pierce Drinkwater in 1843 and they had five children together — Nicholas, Clarence Leland, Caroline Augusta, Clarence Loraine and James M., Jr. They were married for 26 years, until 1869, Caroline's death. He married for a second time the following year, to Abbie Frances Twombly, with whom he had another two children — Caroline Prince Bucknam and Albion Levi. Nine years after Abbie's death, he married for a third time, to Edna A. Marston, widow of William.

Seaborne Drive and Channel Point Road appeared on a 1944 map of the town, as did Homewood Inn, which attracted guests from 1912 to 1992.

The West Side Trail crosses the road near its intersection with Gilman Road.

Notable buildings and structures 

 Captain James Munroe Bucknam House (1740)
 Homewood Inn (1912)

References 

Streets in Yarmouth, Maine